John Taylor (fl. 1718-1723) was a pirate active in the Indian Ocean, best known for participating in two of the richest pirate captures of all time.

History

Taylor began his piratical career in 1718 as a crewman aboard the trading sloop Buck when Howell Davis staged a mutiny, took over the ship, and convinced the crew to take up piracy. After attempting to oust Davis from command, Taylor transferred to a prize ship commanded by Jeremiah Cocklyn, who soon split with Davis to sail alongside Olivier Levasseur.

They captured ships off Ouidah in 1720 after which Leveasseur left to raid the East Indies. Cocklyn and his crew transferred to the captured vessel Victory and proceeded to one of several pirate outposts at Madagascar. Taylor was elected Captain when Cocklyn died, partnering with Edward England and Jasper Seagar aboard the Fancy. England, meanwhile, had rescued Levasseur and his crew, who had been stranded after wrecking their ship.

In July 1720 Fancy and Victory found the East India Company ship Cassandra at anchor off Johanna. After a lengthy and brutal engagement, Cassandra's Captain James Macrae and his crew escaped inland. Macrae returned to negotiate with the pirates and was saved when some of the pirates, who had once served under Macrae, intervened on his behalf. England gave Macrae the badly damaged Fancy and let him keep some of the pirates’ less-valuable loot. Taylor was enraged at England's generosity and organized a vote to remove him from command and leave him marooned.

Levasseur, Seagar, and Taylor took the Victory and Cassandra, with sources differing on who was in command of which ship. They captured some Muscat ships then engaged a fleet from Bombay but were driven off. Off Malabar in late 1720 they traded with Dutch agents at Cochin before returning to Madagascar that December. There they encountered pirate trader John Plantain and fellow pirate Edward Condon. The pirates spent Easter of 1721 at the Mascarene Islands.

At Reunion Island in April 1721 Taylor, Levasseur, and Seagar captured the most valuable prize in pirate history, the 700-ton Portuguese treasure ship Nossa Senhora do Cabo (Our Lady of the Cape). The ship carried gold, uncut diamonds and church regalia belonging to the retiring viceroy of Goa in Portuguese India. The Portuguese ship had been dismasted in a storm and proved to be an easy prize, captured after a brief boarding action. Levasseur, Seagar, and Taylor made off with treasure then valued at more than a million pounds sterling.

The group returned to Madagascar where Seagar died. While there they intercepted letters detailing the ships of a Royal Navy squadron sent to hunt them down; Taylor had the letters read aloud at the ship's mast. Levasseur took Cabo and Taylor took Cassandra, swapping ships after burning the decrepit Victory. After capturing the fort at Delagoa the combined company split up in 1722. Taylor headed for the West Indies, arriving there in 1723. The governor of Spanish Portobello pardoned Taylor and his crew in exchange for his ship the Cassandra. Taylor became an officer in the Armada de Barlovento, hunting logwood cutters in the Caribbean.

See also
Adam Baldridge and Abraham Samuel, ex-pirates who (like Plantain) established trading posts on or near Madagascar.

Notes

References

18th-century pirates
Year of birth missing
Year of death missing
English pirates
Piracy in the Indian Ocean
Pardoned pirates